Anicad Sree Bhagavathi Temple is a well-known Hindu temple of the goddess Bhadrakali located at Anicad, Kottayam district, Kerala, India. The temple is located on top of a hill.

Patrons
Here Bhadrakali is residing as Bala Badrakali. Bala badrakali is the young age of Kali devi. The deity installed as a mirror image facing east side. Shiva, Muruga, Ganapathy and Sasthavu are the sub deities here.

Festivals
Three pujas done daily. 'Kalamezhuthupaattu' which starts from Avittam to Aswathy of Malayalam month of Meenam is the main the festival of this temple. 

Hindu temples in Kottayam district
Bhagavathi temples in Kerala